Events from the year 1811 in Canada.

Incumbents
Monarch: George III

Federal government
Parliament of Lower Canada: 7th 
Parliament of Upper Canada: 5th

Governors
Governor of the Canadas: Robert Milnes
Governor of New Brunswick: George Prévost
Governor of Nova Scotia: John Wentworth
Commodore-Governor of Newfoundland: John Thomas Duckworth
Governor of Prince Edward Island: Joseph Frederick Wallet DesBarres

Events
 John Jacob Astor's Pacific Fur Company establishes a post at mouth of the Columbia River.
 British-Canadian fur trader, surveyor, and cartographer David Thompson follows Columbia to Pacific and finishes charting entire length of the river.
 William Price Hunt, leading Astor's overland party, explores Snake River Valley and much of future Oregon Trail.
 When Governor Craig leaves for England, British Canadians detach the horses and draw his carriage to the place of embarkation.
 U.S. President James Madison, in his message to Congress, says: "We have seen the British Cabinet not only persist, in refusing satisfaction demanded for the wrongs we have already suffered, but it is extending to our own waters that blockade, which is become a virtual war against us, through a stoppage of our legitimate commerce."

Births
January 9 – John Ferris, businessman, explorer and politician (d.1884)
March 11 – John Young, politician (d.1878)
May 29 – William Pearce Howland, politician (d.1907) 
July 20 – James Bruce, 8th Earl of Elgin, Governor General (d.1863) 
August 16 – Luc-Hyacinthe Masson, physician, businessman and politician (d.1880)
October 6 – Eulalie Durocher, catholic nun (d.1849) 
December 2 – Jean-Charles Chapais, Conservative politician considered a Father of Canadian Confederation for his participation in the Quebec Conference to determine the form of Canada's government (d.1885)

Full date unknown
Isabella Clark, first wife of John A. Macdonald, premier of the Province of Canada (d.1857)

Deaths

References 

 
Canada
Years of the 19th century in Canada
1811 in North America